The International Master of Science in Rural Development (IMRD) is one of the prestigious Erasmus Mundus programs under the framework of European Education system. This program is headed by the Ghent University of Belgium and other partner universities are Humboldt University of Berlin (Germany), Universidad de Córdoba (Spain), Agrocampus Ouest (France), Wageningen University (Netherlands), University of Pisa (Italy), Nitra Agri University (Slovakia). And there are a number of the supporting institutes and universities for IMRD from different parts of the world.

This programme gives importance to the third-world students and gives a competitive Erasmus Mundus scholarship for the excellent students.

External links
 http://www.imrd.eu/
 http://www.imrd.ugent.be/

See also
 Erasmus Mundus

Education in Belgium
Education in Europe